No Fashion Records was a Swedish record label (a sublabel of MNW Music) which focused on extreme metal. It was located in Stockholm and was active from 1992 to 2004. It was founded by the Swedish zine editor Tomas Nyqvist.

Bands
A Canorous Quintet
Ablaze My Sorrow
Dark Funeral
Dissection
Insania
Katatonia
Lord Belial
Marduk
Merciless
Ophthalamia
The Storyteller
Unanimated
Wolf

See also
 List of record labels

Notes

References
 Daniel Ekeroth, Swedish Death Metal, Bazillion Points Books, 2008, p. 178.

External links
 No Fashion Records on AllMusic
 No Fashion Records on Encyclopaedia Metallum
 No Fashion Records on Discogs

Swedish record labels
Heavy metal record labels